Lindsay Davis (born November 6, 1985) is an American model and beauty queen who has been internationally published in magazines such as Ralph and FHM. She was crowned Miss Ohio U.S. International in 2010, Miss Ohio United States 2011 and was also a finalist in the Miss Ohio USA pageant for both 2010 and 2011.

She is known for the championing of "Lindsay's Law" in the Ohio Legislature.

Davis was a classically trained ballerina up until age 17, when she was diagnosed with the heart condition hypertrophic cardiomyopathy.

Lindsay appears in a global campaign for United Airlines Mileage Plus Credit Card

Activism and charity work 
Davis, a sufferer of Hypertrophic Cardiomyopathy, supports many cardiac related organizations such as HCMA, The American Heart Association, and an organization providing year round activities for Children with Heart Disease. In 2010, she founded her own charity, Hearts-4-Hearts that provides young people afflicted with heart disease peer support. Davis works with other charities for Parkinsons, Juvenile Diabetes, and Animal Protection. She also volunteers at local children's hospitals. In 2013, she studied Fashion Modeling Law at Fordham University Law School and hopes to improve modeling industry standards and establish fair working rights for models. As of 2013, she was using her own experience with her heart to create awareness and get the Ohio Bill SB252 aka "Lindsay's Law" passed along with Senator Cliff Hite and The Simons Fund Foundation. SB252 deals with protecting student athletes from sudden cardiac arrest.

Filmography

References

1985 births
People from Lakewood, Ohio
Living people
Female models from Ohio
21st-century American women